Events from the year 1831 in Denmark.

Incumbents
 Monarch – Frederick VI
 Prime minister – Otto Joachim

Events

Undated

Births
 28 January – Frederik Georg Emil Rostrup, botanist (died 1907)
 15 February – Anton Dorph, painter (died 1914)
 6 August – Henning Frederik Feilberg, pastor, author and folklorist (died 1921)

Deaths
 9 February – Ernst Heinrich von Schimmelmann, politician, businessman and patron of the arts (born 1747)
 17 June – Jens Friedenreich Hage, merchant and landowner (born 1831)
 15 September  Christian David Gebauer, painter (born 1777)
 5 November – Johan Frederik Clemens, engraver (born 1752)
30 November – Catharine Frydendahl, opera singer (born 1760)

References

 
1830s in Denmark
Denmark
Years of the 19th century in Denmark